Abdul Hakim Ibrahim Muhammad Al-Shammari (born in 1965) is a Bahraini businessman and politician.

Biography
Al-Shammari was born in Manama in 1965. He holds a Master of Business Administration, a diploma in political science from the Bahrain Institute for Political Development, a British qualified accountant, and a certificate in hotel management.

Al-Shammari went into the private sector, founding the Abdul Hakim Ibrahim Muhammad Al-Shammari Foundation and chairing the Board of Directors of the Al-Amal Commercial and Industrial Group and Al-Shammari Real Estate Group.

In the 2006 Bahraini general election, Al-Shammari lost a race for the Council of Representatives, specifically in the seventh constituency of the Capital Governorate. In that race, he won 1,414 votes (36.11%), 1,088 less than the winner, Abdul Aziz Abul, who was supported by Al-Wefaq and the National Democratic Action Society. In the 2011 Bahraini parliamentary by-elections, Al-Shammari won the seat with 1,121 votes (60.40%). Before the 2014 Bahraini general election, the Court of Cassation barred him from running in the fifth district of the Capital Governorate.

References

1965 births
Bahraini businesspeople
Members of the Council of Representatives (Bahrain)
Living people